Lajos Parti Nagy (born Szekszárd, October 12, 1953) is a Kossuth Prize-winning Hungarian poet, playwright, writer, editor, critic, and one of the founding members of the Digital Literary Academy.

Biography 
Nagy spent his childhood at Tolna, Kaposvár and Székesfehérvár. He graduated from high school in 1972, then graduated in Literature and History in 1977 from the Teacher Training College of Pécs (today: University of Pécs).

He worked for the Baranya County Library for two years (until 1979), then from 1979 to 1986 as an editor for the literary magazine Jelenkor ("Our Age"), in which his poems had been first published  in 1971. He worked in the 80s as a member of the editorial board of "JAK notebooks" ("József Attila Circle Literary Association").

He has been living in Budapest since 1986 as a freelance writer and literary translator.

Works 
 Angyalstop "Angelstop" (poems, 1982)
 Csuklógyakorlat "Wrist Exercises" (poems, 1986)
 Szódalovaglás "Soda Ride/Riding" (poems, 1990)
 Gézcsók "Gauze Kiss" (play, 1992)
 Se dobok, se trombiták "Neither Drums, Nor Trumpets" (feuilleton stories, 1993)
 Esti kréta "Evening Crete/Chalk" (selected poems, 1995)
 Ibusár – Mauzóleum "Ibushar" [1992], "Mausoleum" [1995] (plays, 1996)
 Sárbogárdi Jolán: A test angyala "Jolán Sárbogárdi: The Angel of the Body" (a "foamsody", novella, 1997; audiobook, 2007), a parody of a teenage girl's diary with corrupted clichés of the uneducated speech
 A hullámzó Balaton "The Rippling Lake of Balaton" or "Billowy Balaton", translated as "A Swell on Balaton" (short stories, 1999)
 Hősöm tere "My Hero's Square" (novel, 2000)
 Fényrajzok "Light Drawings" (2001)
 Kacat, bajazzó "Junk and Pagliaccio" (script book, illustrated by Ferenc Banga, 2002)
 Grafitnesz "Graphitness" (poems, 2003; audiobook, 2007)
 A fagyott kutya lába "The Frozen Dog's Leg" (short stories, 2006)
 A vak murmutér "The Blind Marmot" (prose, ill. by Ferenc Banga, 2007)
 A pecsenyehattyú és más mesék "The Roast Swan and Other Stories" (volume of tales, ill. by Ferenc Banga, 2008; audiobook, 2009)
 Petőfi Barguzinban "Petőfi in Barguzin"  (poem, ill. by András Felvidéki, 2009)
 Az étkezés ártalmasságáról "On the Harmfulness of Eating", lecture (2011, 2012)
 Fülkefor és vidéke: magyar mesék "Booth Revolution and its Countryside – Hungarian tales (2012)
 Mi történt avagy sem "What Happened or Did Not" (short stories, 2013)
 Fülkeufória és vidéke: Százegy új magyar mese "Booth Euphoria and its Vicinity: A Hundred and One New Hungarian Tales" (2014)

 Translations 
 Tomaž Šalamun: Poker Michel Tremblay: Les Belles-sœurs Eberhard Streul: The Prop Man Molière: Le Bourgeois gentilhomme and Tartuffe Julian Crouch and Phelim McDermott: Picture Book for Good Children Werner Schwab: Die Präsidentinnen "First Ladies" (joint translation with Mária Szilágyi)

 Awards 
 1982: Bölöni Award
 1987: Zsigmond Móricz Grant
 1988, 1993: MTA-Soros Grant
 1990: Tibor Déry Award
 1991: Graves Award
 1991–1992: Playwrights Grant
 1991: Magyar Napló Award
 1991: New Hungarian Radio Play Award
 1992: Attila József Award
 1992: Károly Puskás Award
 1993, 1996: Theatre Critics' Award
 1993: Ernő Szép Award
 1994: Book of the Year Award
 1994: Soros Award
 1994: Artisjus Award
 1994: Kulturfonds Wiepensdorf Grant
 1996: Laurel Wreath of the Hungarian Republic
 1996: Award of the Kelemen Mikes Kör in the Netherlands (Association for Hungarian Art, Literature and Science in the Netherlands)
 1996: Writers Book Store's Marble Award
 1996: Drama Critics' Award (Mausoleum)
 1996: Laurel Wreath of the Hungarian Republic
 1997: Alföld Award
 1998: New Hungarian Radio Play Award
 1998: Alföld Award
 2001, 2002: DAAD Award
 2004: Hungarian Literary Award
 2003: For Budapest Award
 2004: Júlia Szinnyei Memorial Award
 2005: Order of Merit of the Hungarian Republic (civilian) - Officer Cross
 2005: Translator's Award of the Federal Chancellor of Austria
 2007: Ernő Szép Award
 2007: Prima Award
 2007: Kossuth Award
 2012: János Déri Award

 External links 

 Author's page (HUNLIT – Publishing Hungary)
 Author's page (Words Without Borders)
 Author's page (BabelMatrix)
 Author's page (Honeymood Films)
 His entry at a Hungary-related database (DOC)

 Works and reviews in English 
 Poems and short stories at BabelMatrix
 The Frozen Dog’s Leg (short story)
 Oh, Those Chubby Genes (short story)
 Unusual Incident, another translation of the above short story, with an author's portrait at the bottom (Visegrád Group)
 My Hero's Square (excerpts); No Strings Attached (short story); Bagatelle macabre (poems); Smell of hospitals, dawn, tiny nurses' room (review); P. Rose goes airborne (review)
 Miklós Györffy: Clichés and Curiosities on The Angel of the Body''
 Another review of The Angel of the Body

1953 births
20th-century Hungarian poets
Hungarian male poets
Living people
Postmodern writers
21st-century Hungarian poets
20th-century Hungarian male writers
21st-century Hungarian male writers